George Freeman Caldwell (June 20, 1840August 19, 1933) was an American farmer and Republican politician.  He was a member of the Wisconsin State Assembly for the 1889–1890 session.

Biography
Caldwell was born on June 20, 1840, in Chautauqua County, New York. During the American Civil War, he served with the 32nd Wisconsin Volunteer Infantry Regiment and the 16th Wisconsin Volunteer Infantry Regiment of the Union Army. Later, he owned a farm in Otter Creek, Eau Claire County, Wisconsin. Caldwell's other places of residence include Walworth County, Wisconsin; Winnebago County, Wisconsin; Olmsted County, Minnesota; Winona County, Minnesota; and Augusta, Wisconsin.

In 1861, Caldwell married Helen Harkness. They had eight children. Caldwell was a Baptist.

Political career
Caldwell was elected to the Assembly in 1888. Other positions he held include chairman (similar to mayor) and member of the town board (similar to city council) of Otter Creek. He was a Republican.

References

External links

|-

People from Chautauqua County, New York
People from Walworth County, Wisconsin
People from Winnebago County, Wisconsin
People from Olmsted County, Minnesota
People from Winona County, Minnesota
People from Eau Claire County, Wisconsin
Republican Party members of the Wisconsin State Assembly
Mayors of places in Wisconsin
Wisconsin city council members
20th-century Baptists
People of Wisconsin in the American Civil War
Union Army soldiers
Farmers from Wisconsin
1840 births
1933 deaths
Baptists from New York (state)